Arthur Vidal Diehl (1870 – 12 January 1929) was a prominent English impressionist landscape artist.

Diehl was born in London, England, but for most of his career, he lived in Provincetown, Massachusetts, United States where he painted Old World and New World landscapes.  Diehl's Old World subjects include scenes from Italy, Morocco, England, and the Netherlands. His subjects in the United States include Cape Cod, Boston, St. Augustine, Florida, and New York City.

References
Arthur Vidal Diehl biography at Artnet.com (Accessed 3 April 2008

External links
 
 Artwork by Arthur Diehl

1870 births
1929 deaths
19th-century English painters
English male painters
20th-century English painters
British Impressionist painters
English landscape painters
19th-century English male artists
20th-century English male artists